The Jamaica Cycling Federation is the national governing body of cycle racing in Jamaica.

It is a member of the UCI and COPACI.

External links
 Jamaica Cycling Federation official website

Cycle racing organizations
Cycle racing in Jamaica
Cycling